itel Mobile is a China-based mobile phone manufacturer company was founded in 2013 headquartered in Shenzhen, China.

Its products are mainly sold in India, Sri Lanka, Bangladesh, China, Pakistan and some parts of Africa, South Asia, Europe and Latin America. The firm was founded by Lei Weiguo and Shenzhen Transsion Holdings Co Limited in March 2013. It mainly sells low budget smartphones, Feature phones and lately Televisions.

References 

Transsion
Display technology companies
Mobile phone companies of China
Telecommunication equipment companies of China
Mobile phone manufacturers
Hong Kong brands
Manufacturing companies of China
Electronics companies established in 2014
Manufacturing companies established in 2014
Chinese companies established in 2014
2014 establishments in China
Privately held companies of China
Chinese brands